The Fauvel AV.60 (AV for aile volante was a flying wing tourism aircraft built in France in the early 1960s. It was a low-wing monoplane of wooden construction, featuring a flying wing layout.

Specifications

References

Tailless aircraft
Flying wings
1960s French aircraft
Fauvel aircraft
Single-engined tractor aircraft
Aircraft first flown in 1963